Rafael "Liling" Reyes Roces Jr. (October 12, 1912 – August 30, 1944) is a Filipino journalist, writer, patriot, World War II spy, hero, and martyr.  He is the son of Rafael Filomeno Roces Sr. (the publishing house owner and proprietor of the Ideal Theater on Avenida Rizal in Manila, Philippines) and Inocencia "Enchay" Reyes.  A Manileño, Liling Roces studied at the Ateneo de Manila University.

Liling Roces married Leonor "Noring" Varona on January 13, 1937.  He had two children, namely Sylvia Roces-Montilla (born January 31, 1938) and Antonio Rafael "Tony" Roces.  (After Liling Roces's death, Leonor Varona later remarried with Aurelio Montinola Sr.)

During the Japanese Occupation of the Philippines, Liling Roces spied for the American troops Commander George Rowe.  After a SPYRON courier was caught by Japanese soldiers, Liling Roces, among others, were suspected of providing information to George Rowe and Lt. Commander Charles "Chick" Parsons.  Liling Roces was imprisoned and tortured by the Kempeitai in Fort Santiago.  On August 30, 1944, Liling Roces, other prisoners, and twenty-three other members of the resistance were boarded onto a truck and brought to the Cementerio del Norte (North Cemetery) of Manila.  Roces and his companions were beheaded and buried in one common ground.

References

External links
 Roces, Alfredo R. Looking for Liling: A family history of World War II martyr Rafael R. Roces Jr., 
 Who are the Roceses?, rocesfamily.com

Writers from Manila
Filipino writers
People executed by Japanese occupation forces
1912 births
1944 deaths
Ateneo de Manila University alumni
Executed Filipino people
Filipino torture victims
People executed by Japan by decapitation
Burials at the Manila North Cemetery